The Shire of Middle Ridge was a local government area in the Darling Downs region of Queensland, Australia, south of Toowoomba, Queensland, centred on Middle Ridge (now a suburb of Toowoomba). It existed from 1880 to 1917.

History

The Shire of Middle Ridge was established as a municipal shire on 22 May 1880. Its centre was at the intersection of Stenner and Hume Streets, where there was the shire hall, the school, and a church.

On 23 February 1917, the Shire of Middle Ridge was abolished, split between the City of Toowoomba and the Shire of Drayton. In 2008 during a major local government amalgamation, both parts of the former Shire of Middle Ridge became part of Toowoomba Region.

Presidents
 1883: Mr Stenner
 1886-1888: John Truss

References

External links
 

Former local government areas of Queensland
1880 establishments in Australia
1917 disestablishments in Australia